St Kevin's Killians (Irish: Naomh Caoimhín Cillian ) are a GAA club based in the Kilnamanagh and Kingswood area of Dublin 24.  The club is the result of an amalgamation of St Kevin's of Kilnamanagh and St Killian's of Kingswood through founding members Billy Connolly of Kilnamanagh and Paddy Somers of Kingswood. They play gaelic football only. Their junior football team play in Division 8 and the Junior D Football Championship. At juvenile level they have under 8 and under 14 football teams.

Honours

 2014 Duffy Cup winners
 2014 Junior E Football Championship runners up
 2014 Dublin AFL Div. 10S winners
 2012 Junior E Football Championship runners up
 2011 Duffy Cup runners up
 2011, 2010 Jack O'Brien Cup winners
 2011 Dublin Under 13 Football League Division 5 winners
 2010 Dublin Under 12 Football League South Division 3 winners
 2010 Dublin Under 12 Gary Walsh Memorial Cup winners
 2009 Dublin Under 11 Football League South Division 3 (1team) winners

References

External link
official website

Gaelic games clubs in South Dublin (county)
Gaelic football clubs in South Dublin (county)